MixRadio was an online music streaming service owned by Line Corporation. The service was first introduced by Nokia in 2011 as Nokia Music for Windows Phone, serving as a successor to Nokia's previous Nokia Music Store/Comes with Music/Ovi Music Store initiatives, which was based on the LoudEye/OD2 platform. After its acquisition of Nokia's mobile phone business, the service was briefly maintained by Microsoft Mobile Oy before it was sold to Japanese internet company Line Corporation in 2015. Following the acquisition, MixRadio expanded to Android and iOS in May 2015.

On 16 February 2016, Line announced that MixRadio would be discontinued, citing "a careful assessment of the subsidiary's overall performance" and "the financial challenges posed by the music streaming market".

Availability
The service, in MixRadio form, was available as a free app for Android, iOS, Apple Watch, Amazon Appstore, BlackBerry, Windows Phone, Adidas miCoach Smart Run and Harman Kardon Omni Speaker range.

Nokia Music Store was available in 33 countries:
Australia, Austria, Brazil, Canada, China, Egypt, Finland, France, Germany, India, Indonesia, Ireland, Italy, Lebanon, Malaysia, Mexico, Netherlands, Norway, Pakistan, Poland, Portugal, Russia, Saudi Arabia, South Africa, Singapore, Spain, Sweden, Switzerland, Thailand, Turkey, United Arab Emirates, United Kingdom, United States and Vietnam.

France
In France, the Nokia Music Store went live on 23 April 2008.

UAE
The Nokia Music Store went live in the United Arab Emirates in November 2008.

Australia
The Nokia Music Store went live in Australia on 22 April 2008.

India

The Nokia Music Store launched in India in 2009.

Middle East
On February 11, 2010, Comes with Music was introduced in 11 countries and territories in the Middle East: Egypt, Lebanon, Jordan, the Palestinian Territories, Iraq, Saudi Arabia, the United Arab Emirates, Kuwait, Qatar, Bahrain, and Oman.

South Africa
The Nokia Music Store was launched in South Africa on 24 April 2009. The Comes With Music product followed on 27 August 2009. The offerings were rebranded to align with Nokia's Ovi branding on 9 September 2010.

Spain
The service was announced for Spain on 28 September 2008.

History

2007-2011
The service was originally launched in 2007 when Nokia set up their Nokia Comes With Music service, in partnership with Universal Music Group International, Sony BMG, Warner Music Group, EMI, and hundreds of independent labels and music aggregators, to allow 12, 18, or 24 months of unlimited free-of-charge music downloads with the purchase of a Nokia Comes With Music edition phone. Files could be downloaded on mobile devices or personal computers, and kept permanently.

On 29 August 2007 Nokia launched the Ovi Music Store as part of the Ovi platform. services portal from Nokia. The original idea behind the store was to provide to all Nokia MP3 capable mobile users a music store on the phone as on the PC. The Ovi Music Store officially opened in the UK on 1 October 2007 with offering of music from SonyBMG, Universal Music, EMI and Warner Music Group, as well as others. This service had its own software to serve as front gate of the store on the PC and on the phones. It was called Nokia Ovi Player, and later Nokia Music Player.

In October 2008, Nokia announced the Nokia 5800, a direct competitor to the iPhone and with it the service Comes With Music, which consists of a year of free music downloads included in the price of the phone. This service was optional to the carriers.

Within the box of the phone there was a card with an ID that will be linked to the PC (MAC address) and mobile phone (IMEI), so that PC and mobile phone have unlimited music downloads for over a year.

Until 2010 the service had DRM files that prevented files from being burn onto CDs, allowing playback from mobile devices and the PC software only. Market conditions encouraged a move to DRM free, as evidenced in the Brainstorm Magazine article "Music wants to be mobile...and DRM free". In case the user wanted to burn the song, they had to buy it from the store. During the latter part of 2010 and into 2011, Nokia Music continued developing its app client for the MeeGo platform along with its existing Symbian platform.

In January 2011 Nokia withdrew this programme in 27 countries, due to its failure to gain traction; existing subscribers could continue to download until their contracts ended. The service continued to be offered until 2014 in China, India, Indonesia, Brazil, Turkey and South Africa where take-up was better.

Nokia Music launched for the first time on the Windows Phone platform with the Lumia 710 and Lumia 800 on 26 October 2011 in London.

2012-2013
With the launch of Windows Phone 8 in late 2012, Nokia Music came to the platform with an app optimised for the new operating system from Microsoft. During the following months, Nokia Music was also released to the Windows 8 and Windows 8 RT app stores.

Nokia Music launched in the U.S. market on 15 September 2012 with a performance at Irving Plaza by Green Day. Fans were treated to a special performance from the band, along with heavy social media involvement by AT&T, Nokia, the band themselves and Warner Bros.

On 20 November 2013 Nokia renamed the service to "Nokia MixRadio". This change also made its way to the Windows 8 and Windows RT app stores The following day, Nokia MixRadio made its official global launch with a special event in New York City where Nile Rodgers played.

2014-2016
Nokia MixRadio began the year with the launch of the MixRadio app for the Nokia Asha and Nokia X platforms at GSMA Mobile World Congress in February 2014.

The service was again renamed to only "MixRadio" on 1 July 2014, to reflect the change of ownership from Nokia to Microsoft. On 11 September 2014, the MixRadio application was announced for the Sonos range of wireless speakers with a companion app. MixRadio further extended their reach on 27 November 2014, with the application being added to the adidas miCoach Smart Run touchscreen watch.

On 18 December 2014, after mulling a spin-off of the service, Microsoft announced that it would sell MixRadio to Line Corporation, a subsidiary of Naver Corporation, for an undisclosed amount.

On 17 March 2015, the transaction was completed. At this time, beta versions of the app were released for Android and iOS.

On 19 May 2015 MixRadio announced the launch of the commercial iOS and Android apps with simultaneous launch events in New York City and Singapore. MixRadio also announced their partnership with HTC at this event to integrate MixRadio into the BlinkFeed software of HTC smartphones. The HTC BlinkFeed integration with MixRadio went live on 9 June 2015.

During the third quarter of 2015, MixRadio further expanded its reach to other platforms, namely Apple Watch, Amazon Appstore and Tizen. In the first week of November 2015, MixRadio launched as a fully featured web browser client for the Windows and OS X operating systems, mirroring the look and functionality of its smartphone apps. Starting in late September 2015, MixRadio was made available to download through the Amazon Appstore (and consequently BlackBerry devices). The app was also preinstalled on the Samsung Z3, a smartphone running the Tizen operating system.

Discontinuation
On 16 February 2016, Line announced that MixRadio would be discontinued, citing "a careful assessment of the subsidiary's overall performance" and "the financial challenges posed by the music streaming market".
MixRadio was officially closed on 21 March 2016.

Features

Catalogue
As of June 2015, MixRadio had licensed a collection of over 36 million music tracks. These tracks were collated from major, major independent and local music labels.

Mixes
MixRadio operated on the premise of playlists, named "mixes". Upon loading the app for the first time, the user was prompted to select some of their favourite genres, which will then ask for favourite artists that the user can choose. This was then designated the user's "My mix". Users were also able to select pre-made mixes by theme or genre, (for example 'Top 40 Australian charts' or 'Rock workout') or create their own mix purely on the selection of artists.

Optimised mixes
Users of MixRadio were able to like ('heart') or dislike ('broken heart)' a song as it is played, upon which these personal listening tastes are saved and new songs based on the users' preferences are played next in the mix. MixRadio possessed a team of staff that personally curated mixes tailored to the data collected around listeners' tastes and habits.

Offline mixes

A big premise of MixRadio was its ability to download mixes offline. This enabled users to listen to their favourite mixes when not in range of a WiFi or mobile data connection.

Unlimited downloads
In India, MixRadio was available for all Nokia Asha, Lumia and Nokia X phones. Users could download songs from MixRadio for free for the first three months after purchase of a Nokia Asha, Lumia or X-series phone, following which the subscription could be renewed for a fixed time period through the purchase of a voucher either online via the Oxicash website or offline through Nokia Care outlets. For Nokia Asha phones, subscription could also be renewed via carrier billing, with the supported carriers being Airtel, Vodafone and Idea. However, the vouchers were no longer issued from May 2014 and in November 2014, Microsoft announced that unlimited downloads from MixRadio will no longer be supported.

MixRadio for Android and iOS public beta

In late August 2015, MixRadio beta was opened to the general public to help test and contribute feedback regarding the app itself. The public betas were later expanded to the MixRadio client on iOS in early October 2015.

External links

References

Naver Corporation
Windows Phone software
Nokia services
Online music stores of Japan
Android (operating system) software
IOS software
Symbian software